Conor Dorman (born 4 November 1993) is an Irish Gaelic footballer who plays as a left corner-back for the Cork senior team.

Born in Bishopstown, Cork, Dorman first played competitive Gaelic football during his schooling at Coláiste an Spioraid Naoimh. He arrived on the inter-county scene at the age of seventeen when he first linked up with the Cork minor team, before later joining the under-21 side. He made his senior debut during the 2014 National Football League. Since then Dorman has become a regular member of the panel.

At club level Dorman plays with Bishopstown.

Honours
University College Cork
Sigerson Cup (1): 2014

Cork
Munster Under-21 Football Championship (3): 2012, 2013, 2014 (C)

References

1993 births
Living people
Bishopstown Gaelic footballers
UCC Gaelic footballers
Cork inter-county Gaelic footballers